Unified – Alternative for Patriots is a political party in the Czech Republic. It was founded by three MPs from Freedom and Direct Democracy (SPD) after they left the party. The party participated in the 2019 European Parliament election on the "Alternative for the Czech Republic" list.

The party is vocally opposed to government restrictions related to the COVID-19 pandemic. MPs Volný and Bojko have refused to wear protective facial wear in the Chamber of Deputies on several occasions, and Volný was arrested on 7 March 2021 at a demonstration against government measures, for failing to observe hygiene laws. Volný also received media attention after asserting on social media that COVID-19 was an "artificial biological weapon" being deliberately spread from aeroplanes.

References

External links

2019 establishments in the Czech Republic
Political parties established in 2019
Eurosceptic parties in the Czech Republic
Far-right political parties in the Czech Republic
Right-wing populism in the Czech Republic
Nationalist parties in the Czech Republic

Right-wing populist parties
Direct democracy parties in the Czech Republic
Right-wing parties in the Czech Republic